Pastoral is the third studio album by English electronic music project Gazelle Twin of composer, producer, and musician Elizabeth Bernholz. It was released on 21 September 2018 by Anti-Ghost Moon Ray Records.

Two singles were released to promote the album: "Hobby Horse" and "Glory", both accompanied by  music videos.

Background
Originally, Pastoral was to be based on "the bizarre desires related to objects" but the idea got rejected later on.

On the album, Bernholz was inspired by rural life as well as Brexit. She defined the album as her "re-addressing what it means to be English in the face of changing political mood".

Critical reception

At Metacritic, which assigns a normalized rating out of 100 to reviews, Pastoral received an average score of 81, based on 11 reviews, indicating "universal acclaim". Bekki Bemrose of Drowned in Sound stated that the album is "a towering work that truly distils all of its maker's talents into a unified whole", giving the album a score 10 out of 10. PopMatters' Spyro Stasis called Pastoral a "sardonic reconfiguration of avant-pop" that "re-interprets electronic music through an early music/folk lens" while writing in his review that it is "bizzare" in "the most positive way" and that "its amalgamation of traditional musical concepts within this futuristic pop structure is what makes it so enticing."

The album was ranked as the best album of 2018 by The Quietus adding that it is "a disquieting listen", and "Gazelle Twin shows us that any romantic idea of England is a poisoned chalice".

Accolades

Track listing

Personnel
Credits adapted from the liner notes of Pastoral and Bandcamp page.

Musicians
 Gazelle Twin – composition, recorders, percussion, vocals
 Dave Mooney – performance

Technical
 Gazelle Twin – production, recording, mixing
 Shawn Joseph – mastering

Artwork
 Gazelle Twin – artwork
 Jonathan Barnbrook – typography, layout

References

2018 albums
Gazelle Twin albums